Matilda, Countess of Huntingdon may refer to:

 Maud of Northumbria, Countess of Huntingdon (1074–1130), the wife of King David I of Scotland; often referred to as Matilda
 Matilda of Chester, Countess of Huntingdon (1171-1233), the wife of Prince David of Scotland; sometimes referred to as Maud and sometimes known with the surname de Kevelioc

See also
 Earl of Huntingdon